Yair Jaén (born 16 March 1997) is a Panamanian footballer who plays as a midfielder for Costa del Este.

International career
He made his debut for Panama national football team on 28 January 2021 in a friendly game against Serbia. He substituted Jair Catuy in the 82nd minute.

References

External links
Yair Jaén at Sofa Score

1997 births
Living people
Costa del Este F.C. players
San Diego Loyal SC players
Liga Panameña de Fútbol players
USL Championship players
Panamanian footballers
Panama youth international footballers
Panama international footballers
Association football midfielders
Panamanian expatriate footballers
Panamanian expatriate sportspeople in the United States
Expatriate soccer players in the United States